Shouxian railway station is a railway station on the Shangqiu–Hangzhou high-speed railway in Shou County, Huainan, Anhui, China. Opened on 1 December 2019, it is situated in the north of Shou County and is its only railway station.

References

Railway stations in Anhui
Railway stations in China opened in 2019